A list of horror films released in 1965.

References

Citations

 
 
 
 
 
 

Lists of horror films by year